B. truncatus may refer to:
 Bulinus truncatus, a freshwater snail species found in Senegal
 Boreotrophon truncatus, the bobtail trophon, a sea snail species

See also 
 Truncatus (disambiguation)